The 1992 Ole Miss Rebels football team represented the University of Mississippi during the 1992 NCAA Division I-A football season. The Rebels were led by 10th-year head coach Billy Brewer and played their home games at Vaught–Hemingway Stadium in Oxford, Mississippi, and alternate-site home games at Mississippi Veterans Memorial Stadium in Jackson, Mississippi. They competed as members of the Southeastern Conference, finishing in second in the Western Division with a record of 9–3 (5–3 SEC). They were invited to the 1992 Liberty Bowl, where they defeated Air Force, 13–0.

Schedule

Sources:

Roster
QB Russ Shows, Sr.
DE/OLB Cassius Ware
DE/OLB Dewayne Dotson

References

Ole Miss
Ole Miss Rebels football seasons
Liberty Bowl champion seasons
Ole Miss Rebels football